Eslamabad-e Yek (also Romanized as Eslāmābād-e Yek; also known as Eslāmābād) is a village in Dashtab Rural District, in the Central District of Baft County, Kerman Province, Iran. At the 2006 census, its population was 262, in 49 families.

References 

Populated places in Baft County